Katie Dougan (born 15 January 1995) is a Scottish rugby player from Fort William who has played in multiple Women's Six Nations Championships, including the 2021 Women's Six Nations Championship.

Club career 
In 2021, Dougan signed for Hillhead Jordanhill. Prior to this, she was a semi-professional player for Gloucester-Hartpury Women RFC, from 2018 to 2020. 

As part of the University of Edinburgh's team while she studied there between 2013 and 2017, she was a BUCS trophy winner, BUCS Champions, BUCS North Premier League Champions, Scottish league champions and BUCS 7s Champions. In 2017, she was part of the Edinburgh team that was the first Scottish team to win the BUCS League.

In 2016, she represented Edinburgh University in the Scottish Varsity match against St Andrews in front of 10,000 spectators at BT Murrayfield in September. The Edinburgh team won the match 97-0.

Dougan spent a summer season in 2018 playing for St Albert RFC in Canada.

International career 
Dougan won her first Scotland cap in the 2015 Women's Six Nations Championship match against Italy.

After eight appearances off the bench, she earned her first start in the final match of the 2017 Women's Six Nations Championship against Italy, which Scotland won. In the match, she replaced Lindsay Smith at tighthead under the guidance of coach Shade Munro. She commented on her transition to international-level rugby, "The game is much faster and more physical than any club game, but I am loving the opportunity to learn from more experienced players.”

Two weeks before her full Scotland cap, Dougan made her Scotland Women U20 debut against the RAF in February 2015.

Dougan was part of the 2021 Women's Six Nations Championship team and played in the team's defeat to England and Italy ahead of their closing game against Wales, which they went on to win.

She was also part of the 2020 Women's Six Nations Championship, which was disrupted by COVID-19.

Personal life 
Katie Ann Dougan first played rugby at minis level and returned to the sport when she began studying at the University of Edinburgh in 2013, where she studied Environmental Geoscience. 

She was also a member of the Scottish Students shinty squad that played Ireland in 2013. Although she has represented both sports, she says of her preference for rugby, "I went along to the taster session and first social event during Freshers' week and loved the camaraderie of everyone in the team. I tried a couple of sports in first year and ended up playing both shinty and rugby. I represented Scottish Universities in Ireland for shinty but realised I was more interested in rugby where there were more opportunities to develop and challenge myself."

Her family has no rugby history though her grandad and parents are all hill runners - her grandad has competed in the Ben Nevis Race 44 times, winning it on three occasions. She is a former pupil of Lochaber High School.

Honours 

 Winner of the BUCS League 2017

References

External links 

 Katie Dougan Scottish Rugby Profile Page

1995 births
Living people
Scottish female rugby union players
Scotland women's international rugby union players
Rugby union props